Aécio Ferreira da Cunha (Teófilo Otoni, 4 January 1927 — Belo Horizonte, 3 October 2010) was a Brazilian politician.

Son of politician Tristão Ferreira da Cunha, he married Inês Maria de Faria, daughter of President Tancredo Neves, they had a son, Aécio Neves, was member of Neves da Cunha oligarchy.

References

1927 births
2010 deaths
Members of the Chamber of Deputies (Brazil) from Minas Gerais
Members of the Legislative Assembly of Minas Gerais